Bleckner is a surname. Notable people with the surname include:

Jeff Bleckner (born 1943), American theatre and film director
Ross Bleckner (born 1949), American artist

Occupational surnames